Alexander Lundh (born 30 October 1986) is a Swedish motorcycle racer.

Career statistics

Supersport World Championship

Races by year

Grand Prix motorcycle racing

By season

Races by year
(key)

Superbike World Championship

Races by year

External links

 

1986 births
Living people
Swedish motorcycle racers
Moto2 World Championship riders
Supersport World Championship riders
Superbike World Championship riders
FIM Superstock 1000 Cup riders
People from Värnamo Municipality
Sportspeople from Jönköping County